Cheryl Smith (née Waaka; born 12 May 1970) is a former female rugby union player. She represented  and Auckland as a flanker or number 8. 

Waaka made her international debut on 13 August 1997 against England at Burnham. She was part of the team that won the 1998 and 2002 Rugby World Cup's.

In 2005, Waaka became the first woman in Northland to coach a senior men's club rugby team.

References

External links
Black Ferns Profile

1970 births
Living people
New Zealand women's international rugby union players
New Zealand female rugby union players
Female rugby union players
Place of birth missing (living people)